Klimkowicze  (Klymkovychi) is a village in the administrative district of Gmina Milejczyce, within Siemiatycze County, Podlaskie Voivodeship, in north-eastern Poland.

According to the 1921 census, the village was inhabited by 47 people, among whom 41 Orthodox, and 6 Mosaic. At the same time, all inhabitants declared Polish nationalityn. There were 8 residential buildings in the village.

References

Klimkowicze